The Central District of Buin va Miandasht County is a district (bakhsh) in Buin va Miandasht County, Isfahan Province, Iran. The District has two cities: Buin va Miandasht and Afus. At the 2006 census, its population was 27,586, in 6,666 families.  The District has three rural districts (dehestan): Gorji Rural District, Sardsir Rural District, and Yeylaq Rural District.

References 

Buin va Miandasht County
Districts of Isfahan Province